The Willcox Women's Club was incorporated in 1916 which allowed the club to own property. The club was a member of the Arizona State Federation of Women's Clubs. The Willcox Women's Club raised money during the 1920s to build the clubhouse, and donated land to the city in a deal for the Works Progress Administration to build the building.

The Building
The Willcox Women's Club at 312 W. Stewart in Willcox, Arizona, was a W.P.A. project begun in 1934 and completed in 1936.  It was listed on the National Register of Historic Places in 1987.

It was deemed significant as the only example of Pueblo Revival style in Willcox. The building is also referred to as the Willcox Women's Community Center.

References

External links

Women's club buildings in Arizona
National Register of Historic Places in Cochise County, Arizona
Traditional Native American dwellings
Buildings and structures completed in 1936
Pueblo Revival architecture in Arizona
History of women in Arizona